Craig Warnock (born 22 February 1970 in Hammersmith, London) is an English actor.

Warnock's best known role is that of Kevin in Terry Gilliam's Time Bandits.

Warnock has acted in To the Lighthouse, an adaptation of the novel by Virginia Woolf and provides the voice of Dez's dad Clooney from Wishfart.

As a musician Warnock has played keyboards with These Animal Men and Mo Solid Gold.

Filmography

References

External links

1970 births
Living people
English male film actors
English male child actors
People from Hammersmith